Changping District, formerly Changping County, is a district situated in the suburbs of north and northwest Beijing. Changping has a population of 2,269,487 as of November 2020, making it the most populous suburban district of Beijing.

History 
Changping County and Jundu County which administered the area were established in the Han Dynasty. Changping was incorporated into Jundu when the Northern Wei dominated; however, the condition was reversed since the Eastern Wei. The county was promoted as Changping subprefecture had jurisdiction over Miyun, Shunyi and Huairou, in the era of Zhengde during the Ming Dynasty. These three counties were transferred to Shuntian Prefecture in the era of Yongzheng during the Qing Dynasty. Changping became a county again after the Xinhai Revolution, and it was transferred to Beijing from Hebei in 1956.

Geography
About  from the city center, Changping is renowned for its numerous scenic spots and tourist facilities, like Datangshan museum. It is rich in natural resources, mineral products, and rural products.

Other major urban areas are Nankou (70,000) and Yangfang (40,000).

Climate 

Changping District has a humid continental climate (Köppen climate classification Dwa).

Administrative divisions
There are 8 subdistricts and 14 towns with 4 towns of which carry the "area" label in the district:

Economy
In 2017, the regional GDP of the district is 83.97 billion yuan, with GDP per capita at 40.7 thousand yuan.

Features
 Ming Dynasty Tombs
 Cloud Platform at Juyong Pass, one of the "three great mountain passes" of the Great Wall of China
 Triathlon Venue for the Triathlon at the 2008 Summer Olympics
 Qincheng Prison of the Ministry of Public Security (near Xiaotangshan)
 Wonderland Amusement Park (Beijing)

Central government
Chinese Center for Disease Control and Prevention has its headquarters in the district.

Transport
Changping District is served by four metro lines operated by Beijing Subway and one commuter line operated by Beijing Suburban Railway (BCR). Changping District is served by Beijing Subway Lines 5, 8, 13 and the Changping line.

Metro
  - Tiantongyuan North, Tiantongyuan, Tiantongyuan South
  - Zhuxinzhuang , Yuzhilu, Pingxifu, Huilongguan Dongdajie, Huoying 
  - Longze, Huilongguan, Huoying 
  - Life Science Park, Zhuxinzhuang , Gonghuacheng, Shahe, Shahe University Park, Nanshao, Beishaowa, Changping Dongguan, Changping, Ming Tombs, Changping Xishankou

Beijing Suburban Railway
  - Changping railway station, Nankou railway station, Huangtudian railway station
  - Changping North railway station

Education

Colleges and universities
 China University of Petroleum (Beijing)
 Peking University Changping Campus
 Central University of Finance and Economics
 Beihang University
 China Foreign Affairs University
 China University of Political Science and Law Changping Campus

Primary and secondary schools

Public schools:
 Changping District No. 1 High School
 Changping District No. 2 High School

Private schools:
Beijing Huijia Private School is in Changping District.
Beijing Royal School
The Korean International School in Beijing was previously located in Changping District.

Gallery

See also

 Changping railway station
 Changping North railway station
 Index: Districts of Beijing
 List of administrative divisions of Beijing

References

External links

 Changping District 

 
Districts of Beijing